The Swan was a theatre in Southwark, London, England, built in 1595 on top of a previously standing structure, during the first half of William Shakespeare's career. It was the fifth in the series of large public playhouses of London, after James Burbage's The Theatre (1576) and Curtain (1577), the Newington Butts Theatre (between 1575 and 1577) and Philip Henslowe's Rose (1587–88).

The Swan Theatre was located in the manor of Paris Gardens, on the west end of the Bankside district of Southwark, across the Thames River from the City of London. It was at the northeast corner of the Paris Garden estate nearest to London Bridge that Francis Langley had purchased in May 1589, four hundred and twenty-six feet from the river's edge.  Playgoers could arrive also by water landing at the Paris Garden Stairs or the Falcon Stairs, both short walking distances from the theatre. The structure originally belonged to the Monastery of Bermondsey.  After the Dissolution of the Monasteries, it became royal property and passed through several hands before being sold to Langley for £850. The Mayor of London opposed Langley's permit to open a theatre, but his protests held no ground as the property had formerly belonged to the crown and the Mayor had no jurisdiction.

Langley had the theatre built almost certainly in 1595–96. When it was new, the Swan was the most visually impressive of the existing London theatres. Johannes De Witt, a Dutchman who visited London around 1596, left a description of the Swan in a manuscript titled Observationes Londiniensis, now lost. Translated from the Latin, his description identifies the Swan as the "finest and biggest of the London amphitheatres", with a capacity for 3000 spectators. It was built of flint concrete, and its wooden supporting columns were so cleverly painted that "they would deceive the most acute observer into thinking that they were marble", giving the Swan a "Roman" appearance. (De Witt also drew a sketch of the theatre. The original is lost, but a copy by Arendt van Buchell survives, and is the only sketch of an Elizabethan playhouse known to exist. If the Lord Chamberlain's Men acted at the Swan in the summer of 1596—which is possible, though far from certain—( they toured in the provinces in July and August 1596 under the name of Lord Hunsdon's Players) they would be the actors shown in the Swan sketch.) When Henslowe built the new Hope Theatre in 1613, he had his carpenter copy the Swan, rather than his own original theatre, the Rose, which must have appeared dated and out of style in comparison.

In 1597, the Swan housed the acting company Pembroke's Men, with  Actors Richard Jones, Thomas Downtown, and William Bird. (They later approached Henslowe to rejoin the Admiral's Men at The Rose). Edward Alleyn They joined the Pembroke troupe after leaving their positions in Lord Admiral's Men at the rival playhouse The Rose.  In 1597 Pembroke's Men staged the infamous play The Isle of Dogs, by Thomas Nashe and Ben Jonson, the content of which gave offence, most likely for its "satirical" nature on the attack of some people high in authority. Jonson was imprisoned, along with Gabriel Spenser, an actor in the play, and Robert Shaa. Langley, already in trouble with the Privy Council over matters unrelated to theatre, may have exacerbated his danger by allowing his company to stage the play after a royal order that all playing stop and all theatres be demolished. This order of the Privy Council called for all London Theatres to be "plucked down", but may have arisen because of  Langley and the 'seditious, lewd play'.  The other companies were under inhibition to stop playing. The Lord Chamberlain's Men went on tour to six areas of the south east and south west, and the Admiral's Men did not perform again at The Rose until the inhibition was lifted at the end of October. Johnson was released from jail on October 3rd. Nashe however went on the run. All but the Swan Theatre were granted licenses to perform.  The Swan continued to operate without a license until 19 February 1598, when the two licensed companies called attention to them. Following the scandal, the Swan only held sporadic performances. Another scandal rocked the Swan in 1602, when Richard Vennar advertised a new play, England's Joy, to be performed at the Swan on 6 November. Vennar claimed the play was a fantastical story in honour of Queen Elizabeth, and seats sold out quickly.  However, the play was never performed.  The townspeople were enraged and vandalised the theatre, and the theatre never seemed to recover its former popularity.

Because both court and city were interested in limiting the number of acting troupes in London, and because there was, consequently, a glut of large open-roof venues in the city, the Swan was only intermittently home to drama. Along with The Isle of Dogs, the most famous play to premiere there was Thomas Middleton's A Chaste Maid in Cheapside, performed by the newly merged Lady Elizabeth's Men in 1613.  The theatre offered other popular entertainments, such as swashbuckling competitions and bear-baiting.

For the next eight years, the building was used occasionally for special entertainment.  After 1615 the Swan was deserted for five years, but used again in 1621 by some actors who are unknown.  They did not stay for long.

The building grew decrepit over the next two decades. In Nicholas Goodman's 1632 pamphlet Holland's Leaguer, the theatre is described as "now fallen into decay, and, like a dying swan, hangs her head and sings her own dirge." Historical sources do not mention the Swan after that date.

References

External links

Shakespearean Playhouses, by Joseph Quincy Adams, Jr. from Project Gutenberg

 

1595 establishments in England
1632 disestablishments
17th century in London
Former buildings and structures in the London Borough of Southwark
Former theatres in London
Theatres completed in 1595